Final Articles Revision Convention, 1961 is  an International Labour Organization Convention.

It was established in 1961, with the preamble stating:
Having decided upon the adoption of certain proposals with regard to the partial revision of the Conventions adopted by the General Conference of the International Labour Organisation at its first thirty-two sessions for the purpose of standardising the provisions regarding the preparation of reports by the Governing Body of the International Labour Office on the working of Conventions,...

Ratifications
As of 2022, the convention has been ratified by 77 states.

References

External links 
Text.
Ratifications.

International Labour Organization conventions
Treaties concluded in 1961
Treaties entered into force in 1962
Treaties of Australia
Treaties of Azerbaijan
Treaties of Austria
Treaties of Bangladesh
Treaties of the Byelorussian Soviet Socialist Republic
Treaties of Bolivia
Treaties of Bosnia and Herzegovina
Treaties of the military dictatorship in Brazil
Treaties of the People's Republic of Bulgaria
Treaties of Burkina Faso
Treaties of Cameroon
Treaties of Canada
Treaties of the Central African Republic
Treaties of Chad
Treaties of Colombia
Treaties of Croatia
Treaties of Cuba
Treaties of Cyprus
Treaties of Czechoslovakia
Treaties of the Czech Republic
Treaties of Ivory Coast
Treaties of the Democratic Republic of the Congo (1964–1971)
Treaties of Denmark
Treaties of Ecuador
Treaties of Egypt
Treaties of the Ethiopian Empire
Treaties of Finland
Treaties of France
Treaties of West Germany
Treaties of Ghana
Treaties of Guatemala
Treaties of Honduras
Treaties of India
Treaties of the Iraqi Republic (1958–1968)
Treaties of Ireland
Treaties of Israel
Treaties of Japan
Treaties of Jordan
Treaties of Kuwait
Treaties of Kyrgyzstan
Treaties of Lithuania
Treaties of Luxembourg
Treaties of Madagascar
Treaties of Mauritania
Treaties of Mexico
Treaties of Montenegro
Treaties of Morocco
Treaties of the Netherlands
Treaties of New Zealand
Treaties of Niger
Treaties of Nigeria
Treaties of Norway
Treaties of Pakistan
Treaties of Panama
Treaties of Paraguay
Treaties of the Polish People's Republic
Treaties of the Socialist Republic of Romania
Treaties of the Soviet Union
Treaties of Senegal
Treaties of Serbia and Montenegro
Treaties of Yugoslavia
Treaties of Slovakia
Treaties of Slovenia
Treaties of South Africa
Treaties of Francoist Spain
Treaties of Sri Lanka
Treaties of Sweden
Treaties of Switzerland
Treaties of Syria
Treaties of Tajikistan
Treaties of Thailand
Treaties of North Macedonia
Treaties of Tunisia
Treaties of Turkey
Treaties of the Ukrainian Soviet Socialist Republic
Treaties of the United Kingdom
Treaties of Uruguay
Treaties of Venezuela
Treaties of Vietnam
1961 in labor relations